Michael Franciscus Buttigieg (3 November 1793 – 12 July 1866) was a Maltese prelate who became the first Bishop of Gozo in 1864.

Buttigieg was born on November 3, 1793 in Qala, Gozo, Malta and baptized in St Peter and St Paul parish church of Nadur (Qala was at the time part of the Nadur parish). He was ordained priest on December 21, 1816. Some years later, in 1863, he was appointed as the Auxiliary Bishop of Malta. He was consecrated by Cardinal Niccola Paracciani Clarelli on May 3, 1863 in the church of Santissima Trinità Montecitorio in Rome. Buttigieg was assigned the titular see of Lete.

A year later, in 1864, Pope Pius IX created the Diocese of Gozo and Buttigieg was appointed as its first bishop. He took charge of the diocese on October 23, 1864. Two years later Bishop Buttigieg died in Victoria, Gozo on July 12, 1866 at the age of 72. He is buried in the Cathedral of the Assumption in Victoria, Gozo.

References

1793 births
1866 deaths
19th-century Roman Catholic bishops in Malta
People from Qala, Malta
Roman Catholic bishops of Gozo